Gone to the Dogs is a television miniseries by Central Films for Central Independent Television and was broadcast by ITV in 1991 in the UK. The six episode comedy drama series revolved around the relationship of Jim Morley (Jim Broadbent) and Lauren Patterson (Alison Steadman) in the world of greyhound racing. The series had a notable cast and much of the greyhound racing filming took place at Walthamstow Stadium.

The series was followed by Gone to Seed where several members of the cast from this series also appear, albeit in entirely new roles.

Cast
The cast included
 Jim Broadbent as Jim Morley
 Alison Steadman as Lauren Patterson
 Martin Clunes as Pilbeam
 Harry Enfield as Little Jim Morley
 Warren Clarke as Larry Patterson
 Sheila Hancock as Jean 
 Julia St John as Sophie
 Cliff Parisi as Stanley
 Rosemary Martin as Margaret
 Arthur Whybrow as George
 Barbara Keogh as Betty
 Paddy Joyce as Quinn
 Lisa Jacobs as Maid
 Walter Sparrow as Stretch

Guest Appearances
 Bobby Moore
 Martin Peters
 Geoff Hurst
 Michelle Collins
 Donna Ewin

Episodes

Home Media 
The complete series was originally released on VHS on 4 November 1991 by the Video Collection and Central Video. It was released on DVD in a three disc boxset along with it's follow up series Gone to Seed, by Network on 27 February 2012.

References

External links
 Gone to the Dogs at IMDb

1991 British television series endings
1991 British television series debuts
1990s British comedy television series
ITV comedy
ITV television dramas
Television series by ITV Studios
English-language television shows
Television shows produced by Central Independent Television
Films and television featuring Greyhound racing